Jephson (also spelt Gestson)   may refer to various members of, or estates belonging to, a landed family chiefly seated in the English county of Hampshire and the Irish county Cork.

The Gestson surname suggests this family were of Scandinavian descent.

Family tree of notable members

References
 Hugh Montgomery-Massingberd, Burke's Irish Family Records (1976) pp. 633–635.

English families
People from Hampshire
People from County Cork
Anglo-Irish families
Surnames